Nubia: Real One is a 2021 young adult graphic novel written by L.L. McKinney and illustrated by Robyn Smith. It centers Nubia, Wonder Woman's twin sister. The book is a coming-of-age story that follows Nubia's attempts to keep her friends safe while keeping her superhuman abilities a secret. Nubia: Real One was released on February 23, 2021.

Plot 
The story follows 17-year-old Nubia Johnson, who "attempts to conceal her superhuman strength and speed". Nubia is put to the test when she attempts to keep her friend safe. When Diana was formed from the blessed clay of Themyscira, she was actually the younger of a set of twins. Diana’s elder sister, Nubia, was formed of darker clay and by accounts is the true heir to Hippolyta’s throne. As Diana’s better in combat, she may also have inherited the title of Wonder Woman had she not been abducted by the war god Mars as a baby.

Background 
McKinney pitched the idea for a graphic novel to DC Comics, as she was a fan of the character Nubia from childhood. Nubia is Wonder Woman's twin sister and DC's first black woman superhero. She has made scant appearances in Wonder Woman comics since her 1973 introduction and "did not get the widespread recognition as Wonder Woman but many diehard comic fans of color love her".

The book was written and produced by three Black women: writer L.L. McKinney, illustrator Robyn Smith (who is Afro-Caribbean), and colorist Brie Henderson. McKinney stated that the significance of centering a story about a black woman. She described her depiction of Nubia as "strong, powerful, vulnerable, provided for, and most importantly, loved".

Publication history 
The book was released by DC Comics on February 23, 2021.

Critical reception 
In a starred review, Publishers Weekly stated: "Nubia’s humorous awkwardness will resonate as readers marvel at her strength and sense of duty in a world that fails to protect her". Nubia: Real One also received positive reviews from Common Sense Media, NPR, and School Library Journal.

Awards and nominations 
 2021 – Nominee, Best Children or Young Adult Book, Harvey Award
 2022 – Winner, Best Comics Team, Ignyte Awards

References

External links 
 Official website

21st-century graphic novels
2020s graphic novels
Comics about women
DC Comics
African-American literature
Literature by African-American women